Jean Paul Adam, comte de Schramm (1 December 1789 in Arras – 25 February 1884) was a French Minister of War.

Career
He entered the Army in 1803.  
He was promoted lieutenant after the Battle of Austerlitz.
He was promoted Captain in the Old Guard, after the Siege of Danzig (1807).
He fought at the Battle of Wagram, and Battle of Aspern-Essling, and the Russian campaign and Saxon campaign.  
He was made Baron after his charge at Battle of Lützen (1813), where he was twice wounded.
He fought at the Battle of Dresden, where he captured some guns.
He was made brigadier in 1813.  
He retired during the Bourbon Restoration, but took part in the siege of Antwerp in 1831.  
He commanded an expedition in Algeria in 1838.
He was made lieutenant general, comte, and peer of France, in 1839.  
He was created Senator in 1852.

Schramm's is one of the names inscribed under the Arc de Triomphe.

References

1789 births
1884 deaths
People from Arras
Counts of France
Orléanists
Bonapartists
French Ministers of War
Members of the 3rd Chamber of Deputies of the July Monarchy
Members of the 4th Chamber of Deputies of the July Monarchy
Members of the Chamber of Peers of the July Monarchy
French Senators of the Second Empire
People of the French Second Republic
French generals
French military personnel of the Napoleonic Wars
Names inscribed under the Arc de Triomphe